Bumageddon: The Final Pongflict (retitled Butt Wars: The Final Conflict in the U.S.) is the final book in Andy Griffiths' Bum trilogy, following The Day My Bum Went Psycho and Zombie Bums from Uranus.  The book details the events of a young boy called Zack and his adventures to finish the bums once and for all.

Plot

Immediately after the events of the previous story, Zack Freeman and the entire chapel are crushed under a giant brown blob. He manages to escape with his bum and Eleanor, but the others cannot be rescued in time. As they attempt to do so, four Great White Bums descend from the sky and attempt to crush the protagonists under more giant brown blobs, but are saved, and believed to be burned to death by, another Great White Bum. The group discovers that they have been teleported inside a spacecraft disguised as a Great White Bum named Robobum, which was constructed and is being operated by Ned Smelly. Ned reveals that he had no idea that the zombie bumvasion has happened, as he had been trapped underground in a giant stinkant cave in search for their juice, a rare and sought-after fuel for his spacecraft. After discovering a massive reservoir of the juice and mapping out the cave, Ned had discovered three skeletons huddled under a warning written on the cave wall. One of the skeletons was holding a piece of soap that Zack realizes belonged to his grandmother (who had been sucked into a brown hole along with the Forker, the Flicker, the Great White Bum and his cronies, the Prince and Maurice). The warning foretold to future readers that Great White Bum was using the brown hole to send prehistoric bumosaurs to the future in order to bring along Bumageddon.

The group realizes that they can prevent Bumageddon by killing the Great White Bum with the arseteroid that killed the bumosaurs. The group use Robobum to travel back sixty-five million years, but accidentally travel back six hundred and fifty million years due to an error in Robobum's system. There, they realize that they have landed at the exact moment that the Great White Bum hatched from its egg, and Zack attempts to kill it, believing that he will stop Bumageddon by doing so. The Great White Bum escapes and is pursued by the group in Robobum, where Zack inadvertently fixes the time-travel glitch and causes Robobum to travel to the correct era. The group is forced to abandon Robobum when a tyrannosore-arse rex attacks, leaving Robobum to fight it. After a near miss with a tricerabutt, the group is saved by a bum, who agrees to take them to the Crack of Doom to stop the Great White Bum.

At night, the bum recalls her former owner, a child who took good care of her and then abandoned her for no reason. The group is kidnapped by giant stinkants and taken into their nest, where Zack and Eleanor find the freshly-written and incomplete warning. Zack's grandmother, the Pincher, reveals herself along with the Flicker and the Forker, who were responsible for the message. Robobum saves the group from a giant stinkant attack and teleports the group inside, but leaves behind the three aging bum-fighters, who have to stay behind and complete the message.

Zack's bum and the tour guide bum fight over who was responsible for keeping the group safe, with Eleanor breaking up the fight and revealing that the tour guide bum is her bum. Eleanor explains that she got rid of her bum after the Great White Bum killed her mother, in order to become a bum-fighter and get her revenge. Her bum angrily leaves the craft, despite Eleanor's pleas to stay.

Robobum detects a molecular signature exactly that of the Great White Bum at a nearby location and determines that the Crack of Doom is at this point. The group tries to depart, but realizes that they are stuck in bumantula webs. While Eleanor and Ned try to cut Robobum out of the web, Zack and his bum rescue a creature stuck in the web. They discover that the creature is the kisser, who was consumed by mutant zombie maggots in the previous book and regurgitated in the past when they became blowflies, leaving him in his liquid form. Zack believes his claim that he is on their side and rescues him. The group retreat into the craft as a bumantula latches onto it, almost crushing Robobum and killing her occupants as she attempts to fly away. She is rescued by the Great White Bum, who believes that she is a real bum, and falls in love with him.

Realizing their opportunity, the group plots to stop Bumageddon by accepting the Great White Bum's marriage proposal and paralyzing him at their wedding at the Crack of Doom, hours before the arseteroid is due to hit the site. Robobum is carried away by a bumodactyl up to its nest, where Eleanor discovers her bum being fed to its chicks. Eleanor and Zack rescue Eleanor's bum before the Great White Bum arrives, but returns to see that the Kisser has shot Ned dead. Realizing that the Kisser is still allied with the bums, Eleanor and Zack subdue him by sucking his liquefied body into a vacuum cleaner. Eleanor's bum, who had jumped in front of Eleanor to stop her from being shot, is saved by Zack's bum. Ned's corpse is teleported out of Robobum, so that he can rest in peace.

The Great White Bum takes Robobum and the group to the wedding ceremony. After receiving a dress, flowers and a singing quartet, Robobum goes AWOL and refuses to buy more time for Eleanor and Zack. Before they can paralyze the Great White Bum, the Kisser escapes the vacuum cleaner and teleports outside, revealing to the ceremony that Robobum is a spacecraft. The Great White Bum shakes out her occupants and attempts to crush them, but Robobum tricks the Great White Bum into thinking that she has real feelings for him. Robobum sacrifices herself by pulling the Great White Bum into an inescapable hug before shorting out, fusing them together and preventing his escape.

With the arseteroid impact imminent, the Great White Bum announces victory, revealing that the young Great White Bum that Zack had chased off the Earth earlier in the story was still on Uranus, and would simply go into the brown hole to perform Bumageddon anyway. Zack's bum, however, admitted that he used Robobum's interplanetary death ray to kill any life on Uranus in the time that Zack and Eleanor had gone to save Eleanor's bum from the bumodactyls. Accepting defeat, the Great White Bum cries as the arseteroid hits the wedding ceremony.

For unknown reasons, Zack and Eleanor wake up in a barn owned by Ed Kelly, and return to their homes in Marbletown. The two float the possibility that the impact of the arseteroid opened a brown hole, which transported them into the future that they had created. Along the way, they realize that their fellow bum-fighters have jobs in other fields, and that Zack's grandfather and Eleanor's mother are alive. They learn that Eleanor's father is a whaler, and Zack's parents play wind instruments in an orchestra (the cover that Zack's parents used when they were participating in bum-fighting missions). Eleanor attempts to tell the story of their adventures, but Zack stops her, telling her that nobody would believe them. Previously thinking that bums were no longer sentient creatures, the two discover their bums staring into the sunset, making out. Zack remarks that the adventure isn't over, and that he thinks it's only just begun.

Awards and sales
Bumageddon was short-listed for two Australian Children's Choice Awards book awards presented by the Children's Book Council of Australia:
The Bilby Award (Queensland) for Younger Readers: it did not win, but another of Griffiths' books, Just Crazy! did.
The KOALA Award (New South Wales) for Older Readers

According to the author's website, Bumageddon was the most popular Australian children's title in 2005, with sales of more than 90,000 in seven months. It also debuted at #9 on the New York Times Best Seller list for Children's Books.

Footnotes

External links

Bumageddon section on Andy Griffiths' website
Bumageddon UK site

2005 Australian novels
Australian children's novels
Novels by Andy Griffiths
Bum Trilogy
COOL Award-winning works
2005 children's books
Pan Books books